Viré is a commune in the Saône-et-Loire department in the region of Bourgogne-Franche-Comté in eastern France.

Wine

Vineyards of Viré are part of the appellation d'origine contrôlée Viré-Clessé, which is used for white wines from Chardonnay grapes. Before 1999, the wines used to be called Mâcon-Viré.

See also
Communes of the Saône-et-Loire department

References

Communes of Saône-et-Loire